John James Napier (1831-1877) was a Victorian portrait painter active in London between 1856 and 1876.

Biography
John James Napier was a Victorian portrait painter active in London between 1856 and 1876. During that period he exhibited at the Royal Academy and the British Institution.

He married Janet Parker Vance Langmuir on 2 April 1858 in Glasgow and they had two children, Janet and James. His wife died on 26 May 1862, aged 29.

Napier died on 20 March 1877 and he is buried with his son James on the west side of Highgate Cemetery.

Gallery

References

1831 births
1877 deaths
Burials at Highgate Cemetery
19th-century English painters
English male painters
English portrait painters
Painters from London
19th-century English male artists